Serge Piménoff (1895–1960) was a Russian-born French art director. He designed the sets for the 1958 film Les Misérables.

Selected filmography
 Nights of Princes (1930)
 The Unknown Singer (1931)
 Sailor's Song (1932)
 King of the Hotel (1932)
 Variety (1935)
 Nitchevo (1936)
 The Volga Boatman (1936)
 The Alibi (1937)
 Street of Shadows (1937)
 Return at Dawn (1938)
 Savage Brigade (1939)
 The Pavilion Burns (1941)
 The Benefactor (1942)
 The London Man (1943)
 Panic (Panique) (1946)
 Without Leaving an Address (1951)
 Napoleon Road (1953)
 Service Entrance (1954)
 The Case of Doctor Laurent (1957)
 Les Misérables (1958)
 The Goose of Sedan (1959)

References

Bibliography
 Hayward, Susan. French Costume Drama of the 1950s: Fashioning Politics in Film. Intellect Books, 2010.

External links

1895 births
1960 deaths
French art directors
Russian art directors
Emigrants from the Russian Empire to France
People from Yalta